Flora Newton was a British film editor. Newton was employed by ABPC at their Elstree and Welwyn Studios. She was one of a growing number of women editors working in the British film industry at the time.

Filmography
 Living Dangerously (1936)
 A Star Fell from Heaven (1936)
 The Dominant Sex (1937)
 Glamorous Night (1937)
 Housemaster (1938)
 Oh Boy! (1938)
 Yellow Sands (1938)
 Let's Make a Night of It (1938)
 Over She Goes (1938)
 The Outsider (1939)
 Poison Pen (film) (1939)
 Just like a Woman (1939)
 Bulldog Sees It Through (1940)
 Tower of Terror (1941)
 East of Piccadilly (1941)
 Spring Meeting (1941)
 The Farmer's Wife (1941)
 Banana Ridge (1942)
 The Night Has Eyes (1942)
 Suspected Person (1942)
 Warn That Man (1943)
 Somewhere in Civvies (1943)
 Thursday's Child (1943)
 The Man from Morocco (1945)
 Night Boat to Dublin (1946)
 Quiet Weekend (1946)
 Piccadilly Incident (1946)
 The Courtneys of Curzon Street (1947)

References

Bibliography
Harper, Sue. Women in British Cinema: Mad, Bad and Dangerous to Know. A&C Black, 2000.

External links

British film editors
British women film editors